Shai Wosner is a pianist. He was born in Israel in 1976 and is now living in the United States. He studied piano with Emanuel Krasovsky in Tel Aviv. From an early age he also studied composition, as well as music theory and improvisation with Andre Hajdu. At the age of 21 he moved to New York, to study with Emanuel Ax at the Juilliard School.

In 1999, he won fourth prize at the Queen Elisabeth Competition in Brussels.

Since then he has appeared with many important orchestras in the United States, including the Chicago Symphony Orchestra, the Philadelphia Orchestra, the Cleveland Orchestra, the Los Angeles Philharmonic, the San Francisco, Houston, Indianapolis orchestras, the St. Paul, Philadelphia and Orpheus chamber orchestras and many others. He has also appeared with various major orchestras in Europe, including the Berlin Staatskapelle, the Gothenburg Symphony and the Vienna Philharmonic.

In 2007 he was named a BBC Radio 3 New Generation Artist and has recorded extensively for the BBC's Radio 3 Network and appeared with the BBC Symphony, BBC Philharmonic, BBC Scottish Symphony and the BBC National Orchestra of Wales. 
 
Apart from solo appearances, he has been widely acclaimed for his collaboration in chamber music which forms a regular component of his musical activity. He has performed with musicians such as Pinchas Zukerman, Christian Tetzlaff, Lynn Harrell, Martha Argerich, Christiane Stotijn, Cho-Liang Lin and many others. He has often appeared in duo-piano with his friend Orion Weiss.

Shai Wosner has received numerous awards that include the Avery Fisher Career Grant and the Borletti-Buitoni Trust Award. As a young student, he also received scholarships from the America Israel Cultural Foundation.

Shai Wosner is a member of the Bard College Conservatory of Music faculty, as well as the Juilliard School of Music.

References

 ShaiWosner.com
 Opus 3 Artists
 Borletti-Buitoni Trust
 American Public Media

Israeli pianists
Living people
1976 births
Prize-winners of the Queen Elisabeth Competition
Jewish classical pianists
BBC Radio 3 New Generation Artists
21st-century classical pianists